Shahid Ali Khan was an Indian politician in Bihar. 

Khan won election in 1990 from Janata Dal to represent Sitamarhi. At that time he was the youngest member of the Bihar Legislative Assembly. He was again elected to represent Sitamarhi in 2000 over the RJD ticket, to represent Pupri in February 2005 and October 2005 over the JD(U) ticket and Sursand in 2010, again over the JD(U) ticket. In 2014 he was a candidate for Lok Sabha from Sheohar from the Janata Dal (United) ticket but lost. 

Khan was chairman of the Bihar Industrial Area Development Authority from 1990 to 1995. He later served as Minister of Minority Welfare, Law and IT. 

He died in Ajmer, Rajasthan on 5 January 2018.

References 

Year of birth missing
2018 deaths
Bihari politicians